Arklow is a barony in County Wicklow, Republic of Ireland.

Etymology
Arklow barony derives its name from the town of Arklow (from Old Norse Arnkells Lág, "Arnkell's land". The Irish name means "large estuary.")

Location

Arklow barony is located in southeastern County Wicklow, opening onto the Irish Sea, containing Wicklow Head, Mizen Head and Arklow Head.

History
The Uí Garrchon in the north and the Uí Enechglaiss in the south are noted in Arklow barony from about the 7th century. This was part of Ó Broin country after the 12th century, referred to as Crioch Branach.

List of settlements

Below is a list of settlements in Arklow barony:
Arklow
Glenealy (southern part)
Redcross

References

Baronies of County Wicklow